Maynard Sonntag (born January 31, 1956) is a Canadian politician and a former Saskatchewan cabinet minister.

He was born, raised and educated in Goodsoil, Saskatchewan. Prior to being elected, Sonntag was a manager in the Credit Union system from 1980 to 1991.

Sonntag was first elected to the Saskatchewan legislature as the member for Meadow Lake in 1991 and was re-elected in 1995, 1999 and 2003.

Sonntag was first appointed to cabinet in June 1997 and held various portfolios between then and 2007, including: Property Management and Saskatchewan Liquor and Gaming Authority, Post-Secondary Education and Skills Training, Highways and Transportation, Energy and Mines, First Nations and Métis Relations, Industry and Resources, and Crown Investments Corporation.

Sonntag was initially declared elected in the 2007 election, narrowly beating former federal Member of Parliament Jeremy Harrison in Meadow Lake, but was subsequently declared defeated after a count error was noted the following day. The count of absentee ballots on November 19 confirmed Harrison's victory - by only 36 votes.  This result was later confirmed by a judicial recount.

References

Saskatchewan New Democratic Party MLAs
Members of the Executive Council of Saskatchewan
Canadian people of Norwegian descent
Canadian people of German descent
Living people
21st-century Canadian politicians
1956 births
Finance ministers of Saskatchewan